Brad Jamar Ford (born January 11, 1974) is a former American football cornerback for the Detroit Lions of the National Football League (NFL). He was drafted by the Lions in the fourth round (129th overall) of the 1996 NFL Draft.

College career
Ford initially attended Fresno City College in 1992 and 1993, before transferring to the University of Alabama. While at Alabama, he appeared in 23 games and recorded two interceptions, one returned for a touchdown.

Professional career
Ford was selected in the fourth round (129th overall) of the 1996 NFL Draft by the Detroit Lions. While with the Lions, he appeared in 14 games as a rookie, recording five tackles.

References

1974 births
Living people
American football cornerbacks
Alabama Crimson Tide football players
Detroit Lions players